The following is the list of squads that took place in the men's field hockey tournament at the 1980 Summer Olympics.

Cuba
The following players represented Cuba:

 Angel Mora
 Severo Frometa
 Bernabé Izquierdo
 Edgardo Vázquez
 Héctor Pedroso
 Tomás Varela
 Raúl García
 Jorge Mico
 Rodolfo Delgado
 Lazaro Hernández
 Juan Blanco
 Juan Caballero
 Roberto Ramírez
 Ángel Fontane
 Ricardo Campos
 Juan Ríos

India
The following players represented India:

 Allan Schofield
 Bir Bahadur Chettri
 Dung Dung Sylvanus
 Rajinder Singh
 Devinder Singh
 Gurmail Singh
 Ravinder Pal Singh
 Vasudevan Bhaskaran
 Somaya Muttana Maneypandey
 Maharaj Krishon Kaushik
 Charanjit Kumar
 Merwyn Fernandis
 Amarjit Rana
 Mohammed Shahid
 Zafar Iqbal
 Surinder Singh Sodhi

Poland
The following players represented Poland:

 Zygfryd Józefiak
 Andrzej Mikina
 Krystian Bąk
 Włodzimierz Stanisławski
 Leszek Hensler
 Jan Sitek
 Jerzy Wybieralski
 Leszek Tórz
 Zbigniew Rachwalski
 Henryk Horwat
 Andrzej Myśliwiec
 Leszek Andrzejczak
 Jan Mielniczak
 Mariusz Kubiak
 Adam Dolatowski
 Krzysztof Głodowski

Spain
The following players represented Spain:

 José Miguel García
 Juan Amat
 Santiago Malgosa
 Rafael Garralda
 Francisco Fábregas
 Juan Luís Coghen
 Ricardo Cabot
 Jaime Arbós
 Carlos Roca
 Juan Pellón
 Miguel de Paz
 Miguel Chaves
 Juan Arbós
 Javier Cabot
 Paulino Monsalve
 Jaime Zumalacárregui

Soviet Union
The following players represented Soviet Union:

 Vladimir Pleshakov
 Vyacheslav Lampeyev
 Leonid Pavlovsky
 Sos Hayrapetyan
 Farit Zigangirov
 Valery Belyakov
 Sergey Klevtsov
 Oleg Zagorodnev
 Aleksandr Gusev
 Sergey Pleshakov
 Mikhail Nichepurenko
 Minneula Azizov
 Aleksandr Sychov
 Aleksandr Myasnikov
 Viktor Deputatov
 Aleksandr Goncharov

Tanzania
The following players represented Tanzania:

 Leopold Gracias
 Benedict Mendes
 Soter Da Silva
 Abraham Sykes
 Youssef Manwar
 Jaypal Singh
 Mohamed Manji
 Rajabu Rajab
 Jasbir Virdee
 Islam Islam
 Stephen Da Silva
 Frederick Furtado
 Taher Ali Hassan Ali
 Anoop Mukundan
 Patrick Toto
 Julius Peter

References

1980